The 2013 Allan Cup was the Canadian championship of senior ice hockey.  This was the 105th year the Allan Cup was awarded.  The 2013 Allan Cup was contended in Red Deer, Alberta, hosted by the Bentley Generals of Hockey Alberta from April 15 to April 20, 2013.

Participants
Bentley Generals (Host)
Kenora Thistlers (Central)
Defeated Brantford Blast 2-games-to-none (Renwick Cup) to earn berth
Clarenville Caribous (Atlantic)
Won 2012 Herder Memorial Trophy to earn berth
Rosetown Red Wings (West)
Defeated South East Prairie Thunder 3-games-to-1 (Rathgaber Cup) to earn berth
Stony Plain Eagles (Alberta)
Lost to Bentley Generals 4-games-to-none (AB Sr. AAA Final) earned berth by default
Fort St. John Flyers (British Columbia)
Defeated Powell River Regals 3-games-to-2 (Savage Cup) to gain berth

Notes
Late in the third period of the round robin game between Bentley and Rosetown, the Generals were leading 1-0 with less than a minute to play.  Generals goalie Dan Bakala shot the puck the length of the ice into an empty net to score a goal.  It is unknown if this rare event is the first in Allan Cup history.

Round robin

Results

Championship Round

Quarter and Semi-finals

Final

Awards
Bill Saunders Award (Tournament MVP): Dan Bakala (Bentley Generals)
All Star Team
unknown

References

External links
Official Allan Cup Site 

2013 Allan Cup
2012–13 in Canadian ice hockey